M-63 Plamen ("flame") is a 128mm multiple rocket launcher developed in 1963 in Yugoslavia for use in the Yugoslav People's Army.

Development
Serbian Prof. Obrad Vučurović, mechanical engineer at the Military Technical Institute was project manager and chief engineer of development of the M-63 Plamen and all other Yugoslavia MLRS until breakdown of country when he continued to develop for Serbia M96 Orkan 2. His knowledge and previous development has influenced new MLRS systems developed in Serbia in last couple of years including new 150 km long range MLRS which is in project phase of development. His work is widely acknowledged and many of his unique developed features could be found on MLRS around world.

MRL M-63 Plamen main purpose is support of front-line units, with strong and sudden attacks on enemy forces. It can be also used against enemy structures such as encampments, airfields, industrial facilities, command centers, communication centers, storehouses, etc.

The M-63 Plamen consists of 32 Ø128mm tubes, which can fire original Plamen-A and Plamen B rockets with a range of 8,600m. The effect of each rocket on the target is equivalent to the effect of a 105mm artillery shell. All 32 rockets can be fired in either 6.4, 12.5 or 19.2 seconds. The launcher is mounted on a single axle trailer which can be towed by vehicles with an 800mm high tow hitch. The towing vehicle carries reserve rockets, so the battle complement is 64 missiles.

The M-63 Plamen was widely used during the Yugoslav Wars. It has also been sighted in the Syrian Civil War, used by rebel fighters under the Free Syrian Army.

Variants

M-63 Plamen – Original towed 32-tube 128 mm multiple rocket launcher. Uses Plamen-A and Plamen-B rockets (with a range of 8,600 m).
 – Launcher mounted on 6x6 truck. The M-94 is able to use original Plamen-A and Plamen-B rockets (with a range of 8,600 m), and improved Plamen-D rocket with extended range (12,625 m). build by FRY, Serbia and Montenegro and Serbia state
 – Croatian built version with twelve 128 mm tubes, enabling weapon to be towed by lighter vehicles like Jeeps. The launcher fires two types of rockets: M91 (range 8,500 m) and M93 (range 13,000 m). The Croatian Army operates eight RAK-12 MRLs with some 60 held in reserve.
 – Self-propelled multiple rocket launcher with twenty-four 128 mm pipes. The MRL is mounted on Croatian-made light armored personnel carrier LOV.

Operators

Current operators
 - 10 (RAK 12) 
 - 23
 - 8 (+60 in reserve) (RAK-12)
 - 24
 Free Syrian Army
 - 12
 - 38 Plamen-S 6x6 and about 300 towed in reserve*
-24 active

Former operators
 - 4 (in reserve - retired due to lack of ammunition and spare parts)
 - passed on to successor states

See also

Comparable systems
M-77 Oganj
M-87 Orkan
Type 63 multiple rocket launcher
T-122 Sakarya
Fajr-5
TOROS
Falaq-2
KRL 122

Replaced by
LRSVM Morava New developed MLRS for Serbia Army and export intended to replace Oganj M-77, Plamen M-63 and Grad BM-21

References

128 mm artillery
Self-propelled artillery of Serbia
Multiple rocket launchers of Yugoslavia
Military Technical Institute Belgrade
Military vehicles introduced in the 1960s
Military equipment introduced in the 1960s